The architectural school of Nakhchivan is one of architectural schools developed in medieval ages on the territory of modern Azerbaijan.  It was founded by Ajami Nakhchivani in the 12th century. The mausoleums of Yusif ibn Kuseyir (the first in 1162) and Momine Khatun (the second in 1186), constructed by him in Nakhchivan are a classical example of constructions of this school.

History and peculiarities
Small feudal states were established in the territory of modern Azerbaijan because of weakening of the Caliphate. At that times, in such cities as Barda, Shamakhi, Beylagan, Ganja, Nakhchivan and others were appeared different architectural schools, among which were observed a general similarity of architectural style.

The first dated monuments of Nakhchivan School belong to the 12th century. Among them were tower-shaped mausoleums and also memorial constructions erected for glorification of wealth and power of feudal. Origination of architectural type of the Caucasian tower-mausoleums is dated to ancient times, but it hasn’t been studied sufficiently yet. 

Unlike the tower-mausoleums in the southern parts of Iran and some regions of Middle Asia the tower-mausoleums in Azerbaijan have a many-sided and cross-shaped underground mausoleum in terms of burial vault. Such burial vaults have a low and smooth arch. Underground part consists of socle built of a faced stone, the main volume of the tower and a cone-shaped or pyramidal ceiling. The inner part of the towers has the high, frequently many sided space covered with cupola.

Architectural school of Nakhchivan was based on the scientific count techniques. The landmarks were built by exact estimation and measures, plans, area, and accurate plan of the inscriptions and ornaments. The architecture of Nakhchivan is not only known for its stone architectural monuments, but also for its monuments built by red and violet bricks.

In the second half of the XVII century, restoration took place in Nakhchivan, Ordubad and Julfa. According to Ovliya Chalabi, the Turkish historian, in the XVII century, there were 20.000 houses, 70 religious structures, 20 caravansaries, 7 bathhouses and markets in Nakhchivan. Imamzadah architectural complex, Ismail Khan's bathhouse, Khan's home, caravansaries, and bathhouses were built in Ordubad. Architectural monuments of the XVIII century have reached the XXI century.

The International symposiums such as "Nakhchivan in International Resources" in 1996, "Prophet Noah, World Storm and Nakhchivan" in 2009, "Nakhchivan: as the essential settlement and urban working" in 2011, "Nakhchivan: the essential city and Duzdagh" in 2012 played a crucial role in protection of architectural school of Nakhchivan. There are 1,200 registered architectural monuments listed during 2006-2012.

Features 
The upper part of the two-layer buildings has a shape of cylinder, cube, and prism and is covered with a double dome. The two architectural monuments created by Ajami Nakhchivani are the prismatic burial tomb. Ahmed ibn Eyyub al-Hafiz Nakhchivani created round cylindrical tombstones.

Ornamentation 
Architectural school of Nakhchivan is characterized by brick masonry, brick-built structures, the use of various brick, and the architectural ornaments of colorful tassels and ghost elements. The Nakhchivan architects used a geometric ornament structure.

See also
 Architecture of Azerbaijan

References

External links
 Академия художеств СССР. Институт теории и истории изобразительных искусств. Всеобщая история искусств. Том 2. Искусство средних веков. Книга вторая. Искусство Ближнего и Среднего Востока. Искусство Азербайджана
 
 Л. С. Бретаницкий, Б. В. Веймарн. Очерки истории и теории изобразительных искусств. Искусство Азербайджана

Architectural styles
History of Nakhchivan
Architecture in Azerbaijan